The 2018 Blancpain GT Sports Club was the fourth season of the SRO Motorsports Group's Blancpain GT Sports Club, an auto racing series for grand tourer cars. The Blancpain GT Sports Club is a championship for Bronze, Titanium and Iron drivers only. The Titanium categorisation is within the Bronze category, for drivers between the age of 50 and 59. The Iron categorisation is within the Bronze category, for drivers over the age of 60. The races are contested with GT3-spec, RACB G3, GTE-spec and Trophy cars.

Calendar
At the annual press conference during the 2017 24 Hours of Spa on 28 July, the Stéphane Ratel Organisation announced the first draft of the 2018 calendar. Autodromo Nazionale Monza replaced Silverstone and acted as the season opener. On 9 October 2017, the finalised calendar of the parent series, Blancpain GT Series, was announced, confirming the dates of the races at the Hungaroring.

Entry list

Race results

Championship standings
Scoring system
Championship points were awarded for the first six positions in each Qualifying Race and for the first ten positions in each Main Race. Entries were required to complete 75% of the winning car's race distance in order to be classified and earn points.

Qualifying Race points

Main Race points

Drivers' championships

Overall

Titanium Cup

Iron Cup

See also
2018 Blancpain GT Series

Notes

References

External links

Blancpain GT Sports Club
Blancpain GT Sports Club